Chitty Chitty Bang Bang is a 1968 musical-fantasy film directed by Ken Hughes with a screenplay co-written by Roald Dahl and Hughes, loosely based on Ian Fleming's novel Chitty-Chitty-Bang-Bang: The Magical Car (1964). The film stars Dick Van Dyke, Sally Ann Howes, Adrian Hall, Heather Ripley, Lionel Jeffries, Benny Hill, James Robertson Justice, Robert Helpmann, Barbara Windsor and Gert Fröbe.

The film was produced by Albert R. Broccoli. John Stears supervised the special effects. Irwin Kostal supervised and conducted the music, while the musical numbers, written by Richard M. and Robert B. Sherman, were staged by Marc Breaux and Dee Dee Wood. The song "Chitty Chitty Bang Bang" was nominated for an Academy Award.

Plot

The film opens with a sequence of European Grand Prix races won by the same car over an instrumental version of the main theme ("Chitty Chitty Bang Bang"), concluding with the eponymous car crashing and burning in 1909. Years later, widowed inventor Caractacus Potts is raising two young children, Jeremy and Jemima ("You Two"), who have become fond of the crashed ex-racer, housed at a local rural English garage. When they learn the car is due to be scrapped, they beg Caractacus to save it, so he demonstrates numerous unsuccessful inventions to raise money, including a disastrous attempt to market a musical hard candy ("Toot Sweets") that summons stray dogs instead. Discouraged, he sings the children a lullaby that night ("Hushabye Mountain") and goes to a carnival that evening, where he earns tips from a spirited song-and-dance act ("Me Ol' Bamboo"). He purchases the car and rebuilds it as "Chitty Chitty Bang Bang", named for its unusual engine sounds. In the first trip in the car, Caractacus and the children picnic on the beach with Truly Scrumptious, a wealthy woman with whom they have previously had awkward encounters ("Truly Scrumptious").

Caractacus tells the children a tale about nasty Baron Bomburst, the tyrant of fictional Vulgaria, who wants to steal Chitty Chitty Bang Bang, but the quartet escape Bomburst's pirates after the car transforms into a boat. On the way home, they stop to drop Truly off at Scrumptious Manor ("Lovely Lonely Man"). The tenacious Baron sends two spies to capture the car, but they instead kidnap Truly's father, Lord Scrumptious, then Caractacus' father, Grandpa Potts, mistaking each for the car's creator. Arriving home, they see Grandpa Potts being taken away by airship ("Posh!") and follow it to Vulgaria, as the car sprouts wings and propellers to fly. Grandpa is taken to the castle and is ordered by the Baron to make another floating car just for him; he bluffs his abilities to the Baron to avoid being executed. Grandpa and the other inventors rally their spirits by celebrating numerous failures to replicate the car ("The Roses of Success"). The Potts' party is helped and hidden by the local Toymaker, who now works only for the childish Baron. Chitty is discovered and then taken to the castle. While Caractacus and the Toymaker search for Grandpa and Truly searches for food, the children are kidnapped by the Baroness's Child Catcher, as children are against the law in Vulgaria under Bomburst's rule.

The Toymaker takes Truly and Caractacus to a grotto beneath the castle where the townspeople have been hiding their children ("Hushabye Mountain" (reprise)). The Toymaker, Truly, and Caractacus concoct a scheme to free the children and the village from the Baron. As a present for the Baron's birthday ("Chu-Chi Face"), the Toymaker sneaks the pair into the castle disguised as life-size dolls ("Doll on a Music Box / Truly Scrumptious"). Caractacus snares the Baron, and the children swarm into the banquet hall, overcoming the Baron's palace guards and guests. In the ensuing chaos, the Baron, Baroness, and the evil Child Catcher are captured. Jeremy and Jemima are freed by Caractacus and Truly and fight against the guards. Chitty comes to their rescue and, at the same time, they are reunited with Grandpa. The Potts family and Truly bid farewell to the Toymaker and the rest of the village, then fly back home to England ("Chitty Chitty Bang Bang" (Finale)).

When Caractacus finishes the story, they set off for home again; Caractacus dismisses any possibility of a future together with Truly, which she regards as inverted snobbery. The Potts family arrive back at their cottage where Lord Scrumptious surprises Caractacus with an offer to buy the Toot Sweets as a canine confection, re-naming them Woof Sweets. Caractacus, realising that he will be rich, rushes to tell Truly the news. They kiss, and Truly agrees to marry him. As they drive home, he acknowledges the importance of pragmatism as the car takes off into the air again, this time without wings.

Cast
The cast includes:

The part of Truly Scrumptious had originally been offered to Julie Andrews, to reunite her with Van Dyke after their success in Mary Poppins. Andrews rejected the role specifically because she considered that the part was too close to Poppins. Sally Ann Howes was given the role. Van Dyke was cast after he turned down the role of Fagin from the 1968 musical Oliver!.

Production
Fleming used to tell stories about the flying car to his infant son. After the author had a heart attack in 1961, he decided to write up the stories as a novel.
He wrote the book in longhand as his wife had confiscated his typewriter to force him to rest.

The novel was published in 1964 after Ian Fleming's death. The book became one of the best-selling children's books of the year. Albert Broccoli, who produced the James Bond films, based on novels by Ian Fleming, read the novel and was not enthusiastic about turning it into a film. He changed his mind after the success of Mary Poppins.

In December 1965, it was reported Earl Hamner had completed a script from the novel. In July 1966, it was announced the film would be produced by Albert Broccoli. Broccoli and Harry Saltzman produced the James Bond films but would do separate projects as well; Chitty Chitty was done by Broccoli alone.

In December 1966, Broccoli announced that Dick Van Dyke would play the lead. It was the first in a multi-picture deal Van Dyke signed with United Artists. By April 1967, Sally Ann Howes was set to play the female lead, and Ken Hughes would direct from a Roald Dahl script. Howes was signed to a five-picture contract with Broccoli. It was the first film for the child stars, and they were cast after an extensive talent search. Robert Helpmann joined the cast in May.

The film's songs were written by the Sherman Brothers, who had previously composed the music for Mary Poppins. Director Ken Hughes claimed he had to rewrite the script.

The Caractacus Potts inventions in the film were created by Rowland Emett. In 1976, Time magazine, describing Emett's work, wrote that no term other than "Fantasticator...could remotely convey the diverse genius of the perky, pink-cheeked Englishman whose pixilations, in cartoon, watercolor and clanking 3-D reality, range from the celebrated Far Tottering and Oyster Creek Railway to the demented thingamabobs that made the 1968 movie Chitty Chitty Bang Bang a minuscule classic."

Ken Adam designed the titular car, and six Chitty-Chitty Bang-Bang cars were created for the film, only one of which was fully functional. At a 1973 auction in Florida, one sold for $37,000, equal to $ today. The original "hero" car, in a condition described as fully functional and road-going, was offered at auction on 15 May 2011 by a California-based auction house. The car sold for $805,000, less than the $1 million to $2 million it was expected to reach. It was purchased by New Zealand film director Sir Peter Jackson.

Filming started June 1967 at Pinewood Studios.

Filming locations

Release
United Artists promoted the film with an expensive, extensive advertising campaign, hoping for another Sound of Music. The movie was released on a roadshow basis.

Reception

Original release
Film critic Roger Ebert wrote: "Chitty Chitty Bang Bang contains about the best two-hour children's movie you could hope for, with a marvelous magical auto and lots of adventure and a nutty old grandpa and a mean Baron and some funny dances and a couple of [scary] moments."

Time began its review by stating the film is a "picture for the ages—the ages between five and twelve" and ended noting that "At a time when violence and sex are the dual sellers at the box office, Chitty Chitty Bang Bang looks better than it is simply because it's not not all all bad bad"; the film's "eleven songs have all the rich melodic variety of an automobile horn. Persistent syncopation and some breathless choreography partly redeem it, but most of the film's sporadic success is due to director Ken Hughes's fantasy scenes, which make up in imagination what they lack in technical facility."

The New York Times critic Renata Adler wrote "in spite of the dreadful title, Chitty Chitty Bang Bang...is a fast, dense, friendly children's musical, with something of the joys of singing together on a team bus on the way to a game"; Adler called the screenplay "remarkably good" and the film's "preoccupation with sweets and machinery seems ideal for children"; she ends her review on the same note as Time: "There is nothing coy, or stodgy or too frightening about the film; and this year, when it has seemed highly doubtful that children ought to go to the movies at all, Chitty Chitty Bang Bang sees to it that none of the audience's terrific eagerness to have a good time is betrayed or lost."

Box-office
The film was the tenth most popular at the U.S. box-office in 1969. However, because of its high budget, it lost United Artists an estimated $8 million during its run in cinemas. Five films produced by Harry Saltzman, including The Battle of Britain, lost UA $19 million. This contributed to United Artists scaling back its operations in the UK.

Awards and nominations

Later responses
Filmink stated: "It's a gorgeous looking movie with divine sets, a fabulous cast and cheerful songs; it's also, like so many late ‘60s musicals, far too long and would have been better at a tight 90 minutes."

Film historian Leonard Maltin disagreed, giving the movie just 1.5 out of a possible 4 stars, and describing it as "...one big Edsel, with totally forgettable score and some of the shoddiest special effects ever."

, the film has a 69% approval rating on Rotten Tomatoes, based on 29 reviews with an average rating of 5.9/10.

Soundtrack
The original soundtrack album, as was typical of soundtrack albums of the period, featured mostly songs with few instrumentals. Some of the songs were edited to fit the time constraints of the standard 12-inch LPs of the time and to create a fluid listening experience.

The soundtrack has been released on CD four times, the first two releases using the original LP masters rather than going back to the original movie masters to compile a more complete soundtrack album with underscoring and complete versions of songs. The 1997 Rykodisc release included several short bits of dialogue from the film between some of the tracks, but otherwise used the same LP master and has gone out of circulation. On 24 February 2004, a few months after MGM released the movie on a 2-Disc Special Edition DVD, Varèse Sarabande reissued a newly remastered soundtrack album without the dialogue tracks, restoring it to its original 1968 LP format.

In 2011, Kritzerland released the definitive soundtrack album, a two-CD set featuring the original soundtrack album plus bonus tracks, music from the "Song and Picture-Book Album" on disc 1, and the Richard Sherman demos, as well as six playback tracks (including a long version of international covers of the theme song). This release was limited to only 1,000 units.

In April 2013, Perseverance Records re-released the Kritzerland double CD set with expansive new liner notes by John Trujillo and a new booklet by Perseverance regular James Wingrove.

No definitive release of the original film soundtrack featuring the performances that lock to picture without the dialogue and effects can be made, as the original isolated scoring session recordings were lost or discarded once United Artists merged its archives. All that is left is the 6-track 70MM sound mix with the other elements already added in.

Musical numbers
"You Two" – Caractacus, Jeremy and Jemima
"Toot Sweets" – Caractacus, Truly, Jeremy, Jemima and factory workers
"Hushabye Mountain" – Caractacus
"Me Ol' Bamboo" – Caractacus and carnival dancers
"Chitty Chitty Bang Bang" – Caractacus, Truly, Jeremy and Jemima
"Truly Scrumptious" – Jemima, Jeremy and Truly
"Lovely Lonely Man" – Truly
"Posh!" – Grandpa
"The Roses of Success" – Grandpa and inventors
"Hushabye Mountain (Reprise)" – Caractacus and Truly
"Chu-Chi Face" – Baron and Baroness
"Doll on a Music Box/Truly Scrumptious (Reprise)" – Truly and Caractacus
"Chitty Chitty Bang Bang (Finale)" – Caractacus, Truly along with the rest of the cast during the last verse

Home media
Chitty Chitty Bang Bang was released numerous times in the VHS format as well as Betamax, CED, and LaserDisc. On 10 November 1998, the film saw its first DVD release. The year 2003 brought a two-disc "Special Edition" release. On 2 November 2010, MGM Home Entertainment through 20th Century Fox Home Entertainment released a two-disc Blu-ray and DVD combination featuring the extras from the 2003 release as well as new features. The 1993 LaserDisc release by MGM/UA Home Video was the first home video release with the proper 2.20:1 Super Panavision 70 aspect ratio.

Adaptations

Novelisation of film

The film did not follow Fleming's novel closely. A separate novelisation of the film was published at the time of the film's release. It basically followed the film's story but with some differences of tone and emphasis, e.g., it mentioned that Caractacus Potts had had difficulty coping after the death of his wife, and it made it clearer that the sequences including Baron Bomburst were extended fantasy sequences. It was written by John Burke.

Scale models
Corgi Toys released a scale replica of the airship with working features such as pop out wings. Mattel Toys also produced a replica with different features, while Aurora produced a detailed hobby kit of the car.

Post Honeycomb cereal contained a free plastic model of the car inside its specially marked boxes, with cutout wings for the car on the back of the box.

Comic book adaption

Chitty Chitty Bang Bang's Adventure in Tinkertown
An educational PC game was released in October 1996, featuring the titular car where players have to solve puzzles to complete the game.

Musical stage adaptation

The film was adapted into a musical by the same name for the stage. For the theatre, the music and lyrics were written by Richard and Robert Sherman with book by Jeremy Sams. The musical premiered in the West End at the London Palladium on 16 April 2002 with six new songs by the Sherman Brothers. The Broadway production opened on 28 April 2005 at the Hilton (later Lyric) Theatre.

After its closing in London, Chitty Chitty Bang Bang toured around the UK. The UK Tour visited Asia when it opened on 2 November 2007 in Singapore. The Australian national production opened on 17 November 2012. The German premiere took place on 30 April 2014.

References

External links

 
 
 
 
 

 
1968 films
1960s musical fantasy films
1960s fantasy adventure films
American aviation films
American children's adventure films
American children's fantasy films
American fantasy adventure films
American musical fantasy films
British aviation films
British children's adventure films
British children's fantasy films
British fantasy adventure films
British musical fantasy films
1960s English-language films
1960s fantasy comedy films
Airships in fiction
Films about kidnapping
Films about automobiles
Films adapted into comics
Films adapted into plays
Films based on British novels
Films based on children's books
Films directed by Ken Hughes
Films produced by Albert R. Broccoli
Films set in castles
Films set in Europe
Films set in the 1910s
Films set in a fictional country
Films shot in Bavaria
Films shot in Buckinghamshire
Films shot in East Sussex
Films shot in England
Films shot in Germany
Films shot in Oxfordshire
Films shot in Surrey
Films shot at Pinewood Studios
Films shot in Saint-Tropez
Flying cars in fiction
Musicals by the Sherman Brothers
Films with screenplays by Roald Dahl
Varèse Sarabande albums
1960s children's adventure films
1960s children's fantasy films
Films scored by Irwin Kostal
Films with screenplays by Richard Maibaum
American fantasy comedy films
British fantasy comedy films
1968 comedy films
1960s American films
1960s British films